Wiesmann GmbH is a German automobile manufacturer that specializes in  hand-built custom convertibles and coupes. In 1988, brothers Martin Wiesmann and Friedhelm Wiesmann founded the company, which has its headquarters in Dülmen. The business was temporarily closed in May 2014, and following a buyout by London-based investor Roheen Berry who took over as CEO, it is set to return with a new model, powered by a BMW M division-sourced V8 engine. The relaunch of the Wiesmann brand has more than one model, including an electric vehicle, in the pipeline and the pre-development phase of the car has been completed. A teaser video of the brand's rebirth, posted on their website, tells viewers to “expect the unexpected”, while showing glimpses of what could be the first car of the brand's new era.

In its previous era, Wiesmann used BMW's six-cylinder engines to power its MF models, until the introduction in 2003 of the GT MF4, which used BMW's 4.8-litre V8, and the MF 5, which used the M5's 5.0-litre V10.

History

The company's first roadster left the workshop in 1993. By 2006, they were producing the Wiesmann MF 3 and MF 30 roadsters and the Wiesmann GT MF 4 coupé, all of which utilized engine and transmission components supplied by BMW. The company, which made around 180 hand-built cars each year, used a gecko logo because they claimed their cars "stick to the road like geckos to a wall"

By 2010, Wiesmann planned to begin exporting vehicles to the US, however, factors including a poor exchange rates and the high costs of modifying and testing cars in order to make them road-legal in the US stymied these plans. On August 14, 2013 Wiesmann filed for insolvency at the local court in Münster. Four months later, Wiesmann's management board filed to dismiss the insolvency proceedings due to abolition of the insolvency reasons, while the creditors’ meeting was also postponed. Following unsuccessful talks with CMMW, a UK-based consortium that was interested in taking over Wiesmann and resuming production, the company was closed a month later in May 2014, but following a buyout by London based investor Roheen Berry, who also took over as the CEO, the company is relaunching in 2020, details of which will be available on the Wiesmann website.

Early models

MF 30 

The Wiesmann MF30 is the first Wiesmann model ever built.

The model was discontinued in order to give way to the new slightly modified model named MF 3.

Specifications

MF 3 

The primary difference between the MF 3 and the MF 30 was the new engine. The engine featured on the MF 3 was a BMW S54, which is originally from the M3 (E46). The MF3 came with a five-speed manual transmission as basic, and a six-speed sequential gearbox as an option.

Another additional option were the 20-inch rims running on (front: 235/30/20, rear: 285/25/20) rubber.

Specifications

Other models 
Other models exist, such as the MF 28 and the MF 35.

Later models

GT MF 4 

The GT is a closed two-seater with more power than the other models, intended for long distance touring. The GT was first produced in 2003.

Specifications

GT MF5 
The GT MF5 is a closed two-seater & two-seater roadster with more power than the other models. The GT MF5 roadster, first produced in 2009, was limited to just 55 cars.

Specifications

Project Gecko 
Project Gecko is an as-yet unreleased project, the first vehicle announced since the manufacturer's acquisition by Roheen Berry. The proposed drivetrain will use BMW's TwinPower Turbo 8-cylinder petrol engine and 8 speed gearbox, with proposed top speed of over 320km/h and a 0-100km/h time of less than 3.5 seconds.

See also

 Boldmen CR4
 List of German cars

References

External links 

 
 Wiesmann—photos, videos and reviews

 
Retro-style automobiles
Luxury motor vehicle manufacturers
Sports car manufacturers
Vehicle manufacturing companies established in 1988
Vehicle manufacturing companies disestablished in 2014
Companies based in North Rhine-Westphalia
Defunct motor vehicle manufacturers of Germany
German brands
Luxury vehicles
Luxury brands